Gagetown is a civil parish in Queens County, New Brunswick, Canada.

For governance purposes it is divided between CFB Gagetown, the village of Gagetown and the local service district of Upper Gagetown, the latter two of which are members of Regional Service Commission 11 (RSC11).

Origin of name
The original township was named in honour of General Thomas Gage, British Commander-in-Chief, North America at the time; he was principal grantee of the township.

History
Gagetown was created in 1765 as Gage Township in Nova Scotia.

In 1786 the township formed the core of Gagetown Parish when New Brunswick erected its counties and parishes. The parish added territory back to the Charlotte County line.

In 1838 the rear of Gagetown was included in the newly erected Petersville Parish.

Boundaries
Gagetown Parish is bounded

 on the northeast by the Saint John River;
 on the southeast by the southern line of a grant to Nathaniel Jarvis, which forms the southern boundary of the village of Gagetown, and running southwesterly to the rear of the grant, then turning left and running south 52º west, crossing Route 102 and into CFB Gagetown, about 12 kilometres to the southernmost corner of a grant to Robert Nelson at the corner of Lawfield Road and Kerr Road in the former community of Summer Hill;
 on the southwest by the southwestern line of the Nelson grant prolonged to the Sunbury County line;
 on the northwest by the Sunbury County line;
 including Gagetown Island and Grimross Island.

Communities
Communities at least partly within the parish. bold indicates an incorporated municipality; italics indicate a community expropriated for CFB Gagetown

 Coytown
  Gagetown
 Mill Road
 Hersey Corner

 Lawfield
 Summer Hill
 Upper Gagetown

Bodies of water
Bodies of water at least partly within the parish.

  Saint John River
 Duck Creek
 Gagetown Creek

 Mount Creek
 Coys Lake
 Harts Lake

Islands
Islands at least partly within the parish.
 Gagetown Island
 Grimross Island
 McAllisters Island

Other notable places
Parks, historic sites, and other noteworthy places at least partly within the parish.
 CFB Gagetown
 Mount Ararat Wildlife Management Area

Demographics
Parish population total does not include village of Gagetown

Population
Population trend

Language
Mother tongue language (2016)

Access Routes
Highways and numbered routes that run through the parish, including external routes that start or finish at the parish limits:

Highways
none

Principal Routes

Secondary Routes:
None

External Routes:
None

See also
List of parishes in New Brunswick

Notes

References

Parishes of Queens County, New Brunswick